is a subway station in Minato, Tokyo, Japan operated by Tokyo Metro and Tokyo Metropolitan Bureau of Transportation (Toei).

Lines
Aoyama-itchome Station is served by the Tokyo Metro Ginza Line, Tokyo Metro Hanzōmon Line, and Toei Ōedo Line.

Station layout
There is a passage linking the Hanzōmon Line and Ōedo Line. Transfer from the Ginza Line to Ōedo Line is via the Hanzōmon Line platform.

Tokyo Metro platforms
The Ginza Line station consists of two side platforms serving two tracks. The Hanzōmon Line station consists of one island platform serving two tracks.

Toei platforms

History 
 November 18, 1938: Ginza Line station opens.
 August 1, 1978: Hanzōmon Line station opens.
 December 12, 2000: Ōedo Line station opens.
 April 1, 2004: The station facilities of the Hanzomon and Ginza Lines were inherited by Tokyo Metro after the privatization of the Teito Rapid Transit Authority (TRTA).

Surrounding area
 Akasaka Palace
 Tōgū Palace (Tōgū Gosho,  the official residence of Crown Prince Naruhito and Crown Princess Masako. Neighboring residence occupied by the Japanese Imperial Family)
 Toraya Confectionery
 Honda Motor
 Park Court Akasaka The Tower
 Meiji Shrine Outer Gardens（）
 Chichibunomiya rugby stadium
 Meiji-Jingu Stadium (baseball stadium)
 National Stadium
 Aoyama Cemetery

References

External links 

 Aoyama-itchōme Station (Tokyo Metro) 

Railway stations in Japan opened in 1938
Tokyo Metro Ginza Line
Tokyo Metro Hanzomon Line
Toei Ōedo Line
Stations of Tokyo Metro
Stations of Tokyo Metropolitan Bureau of Transportation
Railway stations in Tokyo